Academy of Sciences Range is a mountain range in the Western Pamirs of Tajikistan. It is stretched in a north-south direction and considered to be the core of the Pamir mountain system.

Geography
The highest peak of the range is the Ismoil Somoni Peak. It was also the highest peak in the former Soviet Union. The length of the Academy of Sciences Range is about 110 km. The crest of the range has an Alpine-like relief with 24 summits more than 6,000 m in height. The lowest saddle point, Kamaloyak (Камалояк), is at the altitude of 4,340 m (14,240 ft).

The range is formed with sedimentary and metamorphic rocks of the Paleozoic Era and partially granites. It is covered with permanent snow, which feeds a large number of big glaciers. The total area of the glacial ice is around 1,500 km2.

History
The Academy of Sciences Range was first mapped by Russian geographer and Pamir explorer Nikolai Korzhenevskiy and named after the Soviet Academy of Sciences in 1927.

See also
List of mountains of Tajikistan
Ismoil Somoni Peak
Peak Korzhenevskaya
Garmo Peak

References

Mountain ranges of Tajikistan
Pamir Mountains